Ritesh Sidhwani (born 1973) is an Indian film producer. He is the co-founder of Excel Entertainment along with Farhan Akhtar. His first film as a producer, Dil Chahta Hai, won the National Award in 2001. Through his vision, Excel Entertainment now is one of the first major Indian production companies in the over-the-top (OTT) content space. Their first show Inside Edge (2017) was nominated for Best Drama series at 46th International Emmy Awards, followed by Mirzapur (2018) and Made in Heaven (2019).

Early life
Ritesh Sidhwani was born in a Sindhi family in Mumbai, where he received his education. His father is Chandan Tootaram Sidhwani.

Personal life
He is married to Dolly Sidhwani, and the couple have two sons.

Filmography

Awards

References

External links 

 
 

1971 births
Film producers from Mumbai
Living people
Sindhi people